Looney Tunes Platinum Collection: Volume 2 is a Blu-ray and DVD box set by Warner Home Video released on October 16, 2012. It contains 50 Looney Tunes and Merrie Melodies cartoons and numerous supplements. Disc 3 is exclusive to the Blu-ray version of the set. Unlike Volume 1, which was released in a digibook, Volume 2 was released in a standard 1 movie case. This release was followed by Looney Tunes Platinum Collection: Volume 3

Disc 1

(*): Original opening bullet titles restored

Special features

Behind the Tunes
 Man from Wackyland: The Art of Bob Clampett
 Bosko, Buddy, and the Best of Black and White
 Leon Schlesinger: The Merrie Cartoon Mogul (provided in HD)

Alternate audio tracks
 Audio commentaries
 Michael Barrier on Buckaroo Bugs, Long-Haired Hare, Book Revue, Porky in Wackyland and The Foghorn Leghorn
 Eddie Fitzgerald, John Kricfalusi, and Kali Fontecchio on Buckaroo Bugs
 Greg Ford on A Wild Hare, Ali Baba Bunny, Show Biz Bugs (with pre-score music), Back Alley Oproar, Scent-imental Romeo and The High and the Flighty
 Jerry Beck on You Ought to Be in Pictures, Canned Feud, Tabasco Road and Mexicali Shmoes
 Mark Kausler on Porky in Egypt and Birdy and the Beast
 Constantine Nasr on Deduce, You Say!
 Music-only tracks include: Ali Baba Bunny, The High and the Flighty, Tabasco Road and Mexicali Shmoes
 Music-and-effects tracks include: Scent-imental Romeo

Disc 2

Special features

Behind the Tunes
 Forever Befuddled
 A-Hunting We Will Go: Chuck Jones' Wabbit Season Twilogy
 Looney Tunes Go Hollywood
 A Conversation with Tex Avery
 Looney Tunes Go to War!

Alternate audio tracks
 Audio commentaries
 Michael Barrier on Wabbit Twouble, Rabbit Seasoning, Drip-Along Daffy, Tortoise Beats Hare and Bugs Bunny Gets the Boid
 Greg Ford on Rabbit Fire and Hollywood Steps Out
 Eric Goldberg on Duck! Rabbit, Duck!
 Chuck Jones on Tortoise Beats Hare
 Mark Kausler on Tortoise Wins by a Hare and Russian Rhapsody
 Jerry Beck on Porky's Hare Hunt, Elmer's Candid Camera and Dough Ray Me-Ow
 Paul Dini on The Bashful Buzzard
 John Kricfalusi and Bill Melendez on An Itch in Time
 Will Friedwald on Page Miss Glory
 Constantine Nasr on Rocket-bye Baby
 Music-only tracks include: Rabbit Fire, Drip-Along Daffy, Barbary Coast Bunny
 Music-and-effects tracks include: Duck! Rabbit, Duck!

Disc 3: Bonus Materials
 King-Size Comedy: Tex Avery and the Looney Tunes Revolution
 Tex Avery, the King of Cartoons
 Friz on Film
 ToonHeads: The Lost Cartoons
 Real American Zero: The Adventures of Private Snafu
 The World of Leon Schlesinger
 Bosko, the Talk-Ink Kid (1929)
 Sinkin' in the Bathtub (1930)
 Crying for the Carolines (1930)
 It's Got Me Again! (1932)
 Haunted Gold title sequence
 Schlesinger Productions Christmas Party with optional commentary by Martha Sigall and Jerry Beck
 Friz at MGM - Captain and the Kids cartoons
 Poultry Pirates (1938)
 A Day at the Beach (1938)
 The Captain’s Christmas (1938)
 Seal Skinners (1939)
 Mama’s New Hat (1939)
 The Best of the Rest of Tex - a selection of Tex Avery's best cartoons from MGM
 Blitz Wolf (1942)
 Red Hot Riding Hood (1943)
 Screwball Squirrel (1944)
 Swing Shift Cinderella (1945)
 King-Size Canary (1947)
 Bad Luck Blackie (1949)
 Señor Droopy (1949)
 Wags to Riches (1949)
 Symphony in Slang (1951)
 Magical Maestro (1952)
 Rock-a-Bye Bear (1952)
 Private Snafu cartoons
 Coming!! Snafu (1943)
 Gripes (1943)
 Spies (1943)
 The Goldbrick (1943)
 The Home Front (1943)
 Rumors (1943)
 Snafuperman (1944)
 Censored (1944)
 Mr. Hook cartoons
 The Good Egg (1945)
 The Return of Mr. Hook (1945)
 Tokyo Woes (1945)

See also
 Looney Tunes Golden Collection
 Looney Tunes and Merrie Melodies filmography
 Looney Tunes and Merrie Melodies filmography (1929–1939)
 Looney Tunes and Merrie Melodies filmography (1940–1949)
 Looney Tunes and Merrie Melodies filmography (1950–1959)
 Looney Tunes and Merrie Melodies filmography (1960–1969)
 Looney Tunes and Merrie Melodies filmography (1970–present)

References

Looney Tunes home video releases